Taylor v Secretary of State for Scotland [2000] UKHL 28 is a UK labour law case, concerning wrongful dismissal.

Facts
A prison officer's workplace had a collective agreement which stated over-55s would be retired first on three months' notice. His contract also said ‘no one in the service should be discriminated against on the grounds of gender, race, religion, sexual preference, disability or age’. All over-55s were being retired to avoid compulsory redundancies.

Judgment
Lord Hope held that there was no age discrimination, because that term was subject to the term providing for three months' notice. There would only be age discrimination if the employer distinguished between over-55s on grounds of age.

Lord Brown-Wilkinson, Lord Lloyd, Lord Nolan and Lord Millett concurred.

See also

UK labour law

Notes

References

United Kingdom labour case law
House of Lords cases
2000 in case law
2000 in British law